Carl Smith (born 15 July 1977) was an English professional footballer who played as a full back. He played eleven matches in the Football League for Burnley.

References

1979 births
Living people
Footballers from Sheffield
English footballers
Association football defenders
Burnley F.C. players
Worksop Town F.C. players
Gainsborough Trinity F.C. players
English Football League players